Edera or L'Edera may refer to:

Persons
Edera Cordiale married Gentile (1920–1993), Italian athlete who competed mainly in the discus
Maria Edera Spadoni (born 1979), Italian politician
Ruben Ecleo (Ruben Edera Ecleo, 1934–1987), Filipino spiritual leader

Other
L'Edera (novel), a 1906 novel by Grazia Deledda
L'Edera (film), 1950 Italian film based on the novel, also known as Devotion
"L'Edera" (song), a 1958 song, remade as "Constantly" by Cliff Richard
Edera, Basilisa, barangay in the Philippines
Edera Awyu language, part of Shiaxa language, a Papuan language